Barrio Hipódromo is a small town in the Maldonado Department of southeastern Uruguay. Its name is derived from the horse racing track that is located there.

Geography

Population
In 2011 Barrio Hipódromo had a population of 1,973.
 
Source: Instituto Nacional de Estadística de Uruguay

References

External links
INE map of Barrio Hipódromo

Populated places in the Maldonado Department
Horse racing venues in Uruguay
Sport in Maldonado Department